César Augusto Santiago Ramírez (born 27 May 1942) is a Mexican politician from the Institutional Revolutionary Party. He has served as Deputy of the LI, LIII, LV, LVIII and LXI Legislatures of the Mexican Congress representing Chiapas.

References

1942 births
Living people
Politicians from Chiapas
Presidents of the Chamber of Deputies (Mexico)
Institutional Revolutionary Party politicians
21st-century Mexican politicians
People from San Cristóbal de las Casas
20th-century Mexican politicians
Deputies of the LXI Legislature of Mexico
Members of the Chamber of Deputies (Mexico) for Chiapas